Droceta is a genus of moths of the family Tortricidae.

Species
Droceta cedrota (Meyrick, 1908)

Etymology
The generic name is an anagram of the name of the type-species.

See also
List of Tortricidae genera

References

 , 2006: Tortricideae (Lepidoptera) from South Africa. 2: Three new genera of Tortricinae. Polskie Pismo Entomologiczne 75: 417–425.

External links
tortricidae.com

Archipini
Tortricidae genera